The Burning Fiery Furnace is an English music drama with music composed by Benjamin Britten, his Opus 77, to a libretto by William Plomer.  One of Britten's three Parables for Church Performances, this work received its premiere at the St Bartholomew's Church, Orford, Suffolk, England, on 9 June 1966 by the English Opera Group.

Colin Graham was the stage director of this first production.  Set designs were by Annena Stubbs.  The United States premiere was presented at the Caramoor Summer Music Festival on 25 June 1967 with Andrea Velis as Nebuchadnezzar.

The scale and manner of instrumentation are similar to those in Curlew River, but one notable difference is the use of the alto trombone.

Clifford Hindley has commented on a reading of a subtext sympathetic to homosexuality on the part of both Britten and Plomer in their treatment of the story.

Roles

Synopsis
The Burning Fiery Furnace tells the story of Nebuchadnezzar  (the historical Nebuchadnezzar II) and the three Israelites, Ananias, Misael and Asarias (corresponding Babylonian names: Shadrach, Meshach and Abednego), who were thrown into a furnace for their refusal to worship Nebuchadnezzar's image of gold.  However, God saves them from death, as the voice of an angel joins the Israelites in a 'Benedicite'.

Recording
Britten himself, along with Viola Tunnard, supervised the first commercial recording of this work, for Decca/London, with the following participants:
 Nebuchadnezzar: Peter Pears
 The Astrologer: Bryan Drake
 Ananias (Shadrach): John Shirley-Quirk
 Misael (Meshach): Robert Tear
 Asarias (Abednego): Stafford Dean
 The Herald: Peter Leeming
 Chorus of Courtiers: Graham Allum, Peter Bedford, Carl Duggan, David Hartley, John McKenzie, Clive Molloy, Malcolm Rivers
 The Acolytes: Robert Alder, Paull Boucher, James Newby, Stephen Price, Christopher Taylor
The instrumentalists were Richard Adeney (flute), Neill Sanders (horn), Roger Brenner (trombone), Cecil Aronowitz (viola), Keith Marjoram (double bass), Osian Ellis (harp), James Blades (percussion) and Philip Ledger (organ).

References

Sources
Holden, Amanda (Ed.), The New Penguin Opera Guide, New York: Penguin Putnam, 2001. 
Warrack, John and West, Ewan, The Oxford Dictionary of Opera New York: OUP: 1992

External links 
 Britten-Pears Foundation, page on The Burning Fiery Furnace 
  Recordings of The Burning Fiery Furnace on operadis-opera-discography.org.uk

Operas by Benjamin Britten
Chamber operas
Operas
Cultural depictions of Daniel (biblical figure)
Shadrach, Meshach, and Abednego
Operas based on the Bible